The Cawder Challenge was a golf tournament on the Challenge Tour.

The event was played in Scotland annually 1991–1994. After a break, it was succeeded by the Scottish Challenge in 2006.

Winners

References

External links
Official coverage on the Challenge Tour's official site

Former Challenge Tour events
Golf tournaments in Scotland
Defunct golf tournaments
Sport in Angus, Scotland
Sport in East Dunbartonshire
Recurring sporting events established in 1991
Recurring sporting events disestablished in 1994
1991 establishments in Scotland
1994 disestablishments in Scotland